Bahlul Khan Lodi (12 July 1489) was the chief of the Afghan Lodi tribe. Founder of the Lodi dynasty from the Delhi Sultanate upon the abdication of the last claimant from the previous Sayyid rule. Bahlul became sultan of the dynasty on 19 April 1451 (855 AH).

Early life 
Bahlul's grandfather, Malik Bahram Khan Lodi, a Ghilzai tribal chief of Lodi tribe. He later took service under the governor of Multan, Malik Mardan Daulat . Bahram had a total of about five sons. His eldest son, Malik Sultan Shah Lodi, later served under the Sayyid dynasty ruler Khizr Khan and distinguished himself by killing in the battle later's worst enemy Mallu Iqbal Khan. He was rewarded with the title of Islam Khan and in 1419 appointed the governor of Sirhind. Bahlul, the son of Malik Kala Khan Lodi, the younger brother of Malik Sultan was married to Malik Sultan's daughter.

In his youth, Bahlul was involved in the trading of horses and once sold his finely bred horses to the Sayyid dynasty Sultan Mohammad Shah. As a payment he was granted a pargana and raised to the status of amir. After the death of Malik Sultan, he became the governor of Sirhind. He was allowed to add Lahore to his charge. Once, Sultan Muhammad Shah asked for his help when the Malwa Sultan Mahmud Khalji invaded his territory. Bahlul joined the imperial army with 20,000 mounted soldiers. By his cleverness, he was able to project himself as a victor over the army of the Malwa Sultan and Sultan Muhammad Shah conferred on him the title of Khan-i-Khanan. He also accepted Bahlul's occupation over a large part of Punjab.

In 1443, Bahlul attacked Delhi but he did not succeed. During the reign of last Sayyid ruler Sultan Alam Shah, Bahlul again made an unsuccessful attempt to capture Delhi in 1447. In 1448, when Alam Shah retired to Badaun, a minister of Alam Shah, Hamid Khan invited him to occupy the throne of Delhi. After the voluntary abdication of the throne by Alam Shah, Bahlul Shah ascended the throne of Delhi on 19 April 1451 and adopted the title of Bahlul Shah Ghazi. Alam Shah continued to live in Badaun until his death in July 1478.

Reign

After ascending to the throne, Bahlul decided to dispose of Hamid Khan.  His cousin and brother-in-law Malik Mahmud Khan alias Qutb-ud-din Khan (Governor of Samana) imprisoned Hamid Khan.

In 1479, Sultan Bahlul Lodi defeated and annexed the Jaunpur Sultanate based at Jaunpur. He fortified the city of Jaunpur and turned it into a kasbah with several mosques and madrasas. Bahlul did much to stop rebellions and uprisings in his territories, and extended his holdings over Gwalior, Jaunpur and upper Uttar Pradesh. Just like the previous Delhi Sultans, he kept Delhi the capital of his kingdom. In 1486, he appointed his son, Babrak Shah as viceroy of Jaunpur. In time, this proved to be problematic, as his second son, Nizam Khan (Sikandar Lodi) was named successor, and a power struggle ensued upon his death in July 1489. The site of his grave is disputed. The Archeological Survey of India has long designated a building close to the shrine of the noted Sufi saint Nasiruddin Chirag-e-Delhi in a locality that goes by his name, 'Chirag Delhi', as Bahlul Lodi's tomb. Other historians argue that the Sheesh Gumbad in the Lodi Gardens is actually to be identified with his tomb.

Marriages

Bahlul married two times:
Shams Khatun, daughter of Sultan Malik Shah Lodi, his first cousin;
Bibi Ambha, daughter of a Hindu goldsmith

See also 
 Sher Shah Suri
 Jaunpur Sultanate
 Shaikh Sama'al-Din Kamboh
 Tomb of Bahlul Lodi

References

1489 deaths
Sultans of the Lodi dynasty
15th-century Indian monarchs
15th-century Indian Muslims
People from Delhi
Indian people of Pashtun descent
Year of birth unknown